Matt Foreman may refer to:

Matthew Foreman, mathematician
Matt Foreman (activist)